Girl is a three-issue comic book limited series written by Peter Milligan and drawn by Duncan Fegredo. It was published in 1996 by Vertigo comics, an imprint of DC Comics.

Plot synopsis 
The story follows the exploits of fifteen-year-old Simone Cundy, a resident of Bollockstown (a fictional English location), as she attempts to make sense of her uncontrollable apathy and discontent for life (early on, she cites girls, boys, the lottery, pop-stars, clothes, sport, tampons, television, Bollockstown and living among her chief dislikes). However, upon meeting Polly, the "blonde version" of herself, Simone struggles to maintain the line between reality and her imagination, all the while trying find some purpose in her rotten life.

Further reading
 "Simone Cundy" in The Spectacular Sisterhood of Superwomen: Awesome Female Characters from Comic Book History by Hope Nicholson, Quirk Books (2017)

External links

 

Comics by Peter Milligan